Stephen or Steven Engel may refer to:

 Stephen Engel, American TV producer and writer
 Stephen M. Engel, American academic and political scientist
 Steve Engel (born 1961), American baseball player
 Steven Engel (born 1974), American lawyer and former Justice Department official